Masakatsu Nishikawa may refer to:
 Masakatsu Nishikawa (rugby union)
 Masakatsu Nishikawa (serial killer)